In architecture, intercolumniation is the proportional spacing between columns in a colonnade, often expressed as a multiple of the column diameter as measured at the bottom of the shaft.  In Classical, Renaissance, and Baroque architecture, intercolumniation was determined by a system described by the first-century BC Roman architect Vitruvius (Vitruvius, De architectura, iii.3.3-10). Vitruvius named five systems of intercolumniation (Pycnostyle, Systyle, Eustyle, Diastyle, and Araeostyle), and warned that when columns are placed three column-diameters or more apart, stone architraves break. According to Vitruvius, the Hellenistic architect Hermogenes (ca. 200 BC) formulated these proportions ("symmetriae") and perfected the Eustyle arrangement, which has an enlarged bay in the center of the façade.

Standard intercolumniations
The standard intercolumniations are:
 Pycnostyle  One and a half diameters
 Systyle  Two diameters
 Eustyle  Two and a quarter diameters (and three diameters between middle columns front and rear); considered by Vitruvius to be the best proportion.  
 Diastyle  Three diameters
 Araeostyle  Four or more diameters, requiring a wooden architrave rather than one of stone
 Araeosystyle  Alternating araeostyle and systyle

Vitruvius's definitions seem to apply only to examples with which he was acquainted in Rome, or to Greek temples described by authors he had studied. The intercolumniations of the columns of the Ionic Order are greater, averaging 2 diameters, but then the relative proportion of height to diameter in the column has to be taken into account, as also the width of the peristyle. Thus in the temple of Apollo Branchidae, where the columns are slender and over 10 diameters in height, the intercolumniation is  notwithstanding its late date, and in the Temple of Apollo Smintheus in Asia Minor, in which the peristyle is pseudodipteral, or double width, the intercolumniation is just over 1. Temples of the Corinthian Order follow the proportions of those of the Ionic Order.

See also
List of architecture topics
Architectural glossary

References

Colonnades